Sandhippoma is a 1998 Indian Tamil-language romantic drama film directed by Indrakumar. The film stars Suriya and Preetha Vijayakumar, while Raadhika, Prakash Raj, Sarath Babu and Ambika also play significant roles. Deva composed the film's soundtrack while Rathnavelu handled the camera work. The film released on 9 July 1998. It was dubbed into Telugu as Viswam.

Plot
Vishwa (Suriya) and Nilani (Preetha Vijayakumar) fall in love. Her mother does not approve, but she goes along with it. Complications arise when Vishwa exhibits "fashion" photos that he has taken of Nilani, which further upsets her mother. Then it comes to light that Surya's father Santhosh (Prakash Raj) had an affair, and things take a dramatic, tragic turn for the lovers. In the end, both families arrive at the airport to prevent Nilani from boarding the flight, but to their bad luck, they could not stop it. Nilani commits suicide by swallowing poison from her ring, and Vishwa hits a wall and loses his sanity.

Cast

Suriya as Vishwa
Preetha Vijayakumar as Nilani
Prakash Raj as Santhosh, Vishwa's father
Ambika as Ambika, Nilani's mother
Raadhika as Vishwa's mother
Sarath Babu as Nilani's father
Manivannan
Anandaraj
Vaiyapuri as Hospital patient
Rani
Alphonso
Baby Jennifer as Vishwa's sister

Production
The film was produced by Malaysia-based Tamil settlers Rajah and Vijayan. Rajah owned Rajah Video Centre in Sentul while his partner, Vijayan, was also a businessman from Sentul. The shoot of the film was carried out in places such as Rajasthan and Goa.

Actor Sivakumar turned down the opportunity to play Suriya's father in the film, and was replaced by Prakash Raj.

Soundtrack

Music was composed by Deva. The lyrics for the songs were written by Vairamuthu, Ponniyin Selvan, Palani Bharathi and Kalidasan.

Critical reception 
Indolink.com strongly gave a negative review stating that it's basically supporting actors beheading the lead actors and why do actor's son and daughter come to act in movies and criticized Suriya for his tedious face expressions. Suriya and Preetha vijayakumar could have just watched how Prakash Raj and Raadhika emote during emotional scenes instead of participating as hero and heroine.

References

External links

1998 films
Indian romantic drama films
Films scored by Deva (composer)
1990s Tamil-language films
1998 romantic drama films
Super Good Films films